"Tatoue-moi" is a 2008 French pop song recorded by Italian singer Mikelangelo Loconte. It is the first single from the musical Mozart, l'opéra rock and from the album of the same name, released on April 6, 2009. Olivier Schultheis, Jean Schultheis' son, participated in the composing of the song. The single was released on December 15, 2008  and achieved huge success in France, where it went straight to number-one on the SNEP singles chart on January 17, 2009, selling 8,280 copies and remained atop for five consecutive weeks. It was also number-one on the French digital chart, for a sole week.

Track listings
 CD single
 "Tatoue-moi" — 3:20
 "Quand le rideau tombe" —3:54
 "Tatoue-moi" (video)
 Bonus : Les coulisses du tournage du clip "Tatoue-moi"

 Digital download
 "Tatoue-moi" — 3:20

Charts

References

2008 debut singles
Mikelangelo Loconte songs
SNEP Top Singles number-one singles
Songs from musicals
2008 songs
Songs written by William Rousseau
Songs with lyrics by Patrice Guirao